
Elea may refer to:

Greek-speaking cities and derived items
 "Elean", a common archaic adjective meaning someone from ancient Elis
 Elea, ancient name of an Italian-Greek colony, now known as Velia
Eleatics, a school of pre-Socratic philosophers at Elea
 Elea in Aeolis, an ancient Greek city in Turkey
 Elaea (Epirus), an ancient city in Greece in the regional unit of Thesprotia

Cypriot towns
 Elea, a city in Cyprus destroyed by earthquake in 343 AD, near modern Ayios Theodoros Karpasias
 Elia, Kyrenia, a settlement in Cyprus
 Elia, Nicosia, a settlement in Cyprus

Other
 Olivetti Elea, a mainframe computer manufactured from 1959 through 1964
 Elea (bryozoan), an extinct genus in the order Cyclostomatida
 Elea, the personification of pity, mercy, clemency, and compassion

See also
Velia (disambiguation)